Carswell is an unincorporated community located in McDowell County, West Virginia, United States. Carswell lies to the north of the town of Kimball.

References 

Unincorporated communities in McDowell County, West Virginia
Unincorporated communities in West Virginia
Coal towns in West Virginia